Hypostomus microstomus is a species of catfish in the family Loricariidae. It is native to South America, where it occurs in the middle Paraná River basin in Argentina, Brazil, Paraguay, and Uruguay. The species reaches 24 cm (9.4 inches) in standard length and is believed to be a facultative air-breather.

References 
 

microstomus
Fish described in 1987